Venan Entertainment, Inc. is a mobile and handheld game development studio based in Middletown, Connecticut. Founded in 2002, Venan began primarily as a Java/Brew-based mobile phone game developer, but has since branched off to develop games for Nintendo DS, iPod, and iPhone OS. Venan's most recent titles include their fifth fully independent, self-published title Book of Heroes, and the TouchArcade and EGM Game of the Year Space Miner: Space Ore Bust,. Both are available for the iOS devices.  Other recent Venan-developed titles include Ninjatown for the Nintendo DS, Monopoly Worldwide and Monopoly Classic for the iPhone and iPod Touch, and NBA Live for the iPhone and iPod Touch.

Venan has also developed and released many mobile phone titles, including High Seas: Guns & Gold, TI Street Racing, True Crime: New York City, and NBA Street.

iPhone OS games
Book of Heroes (2011)
Road Trippin' (2011, Published by EA)
Ninjatown: Trees of Doom (2010)
Space Miner: Space Ore Bust (2010)
Sonic at the Olympic Winter Games (2010, Published by Sega)
NBA Live (2009, Published by EA)
Monopoly Classic (2009, Published by EA)
Monopoly Worldwide (2008, Published by EA)
Monopoly for iPod (2008, Published by EA)

Android Games
Book of Heroes (2012)
Ninjatown: Trees of Doom (2012)

Nintendo DS Games
Monopoly (2010)
Ninjatown (2008)

Mobile games
Marble Madness (2009)
Monopoly: Here & Now (2008)
Monopoly World (2008)
NBA Street (2D/3D) (2008)
Monopoly (2008)
SpongeBob SquarePants Atlantis Treasures (2007)
Road Rash (2007)
NBA Live 08 (2D/3D) (2007)
High Seas: Guns & Gold (2006)
NBA Live 07 (3D) (2006)
True Crime: New York City (2006)
TI Street Racing (2006)
Jaws (2006)
Jaws (3D) (2006)
Crank Yankers: Connect the Call (2005)
Harlem Globetrotters (2005)
Super Putt Xtreme (2005)
South Park Mecha Fighter (2005)
CBS Sportsline Track & Field 2004 (2004)
Bill Parcells Football Camp (2004)
Winter Games (2004)
Super Putt Classic (2003)

References

External links
Official website
Venan Arcade website

Video game companies established in 2002
Video game companies of the United States
Video game development companies
2002 establishments in Connecticut
Middletown, Connecticut
Companies based in Middlesex County, Connecticut